Heliura fulvipicta is a moth of the subfamily Arctiinae. It was described by William James Kaye in 1911. It is found in Guyana.

References

 

Arctiinae
Moths described in 1911